Sun Yat-sen (also known by several other names; 12 November 1866 – 12 March 1925) was a Chinese statesman, physician, and political philosopher who served as the first provisional president of the Republic of China and the first leader of the Kuomintang (Nationalist Party of China). He is called the "Father of the Nation" in the Republic of China, and the "Forerunner of the Revolution" in the People's Republic of China for his instrumental role in the overthrow of the Qing dynasty during the Xinhai Revolution. Sun is unique among 20th-century Chinese leaders for being widely revered by both the Communist Party in Mainland China and the Nationalist Party in Taiwan.

Sun is considered to be one of the greatest leaders of modern China, but his political life was one of constant struggle and frequent exile. After the success of the revolution in 1911, he quickly resigned as president of the newly founded Republic of China and relinquished the position to Yuan Shikai. He soon went to exile in Japan for safety but returned to found a revolutionary government in the South as a challenge to the warlords who controlled much of the nation. In 1923, he invited representatives of the Communist International to Canton (Guangzhou) to re-organize his party and formed a brittle alliance with the Chinese Communist Party. He did not live to see his party unify the country under his successor, Chiang Kai-shek, in the Northern Expedition. He died in Peking (Beijing) of gallbladder cancer in 1925.

Sun's chief legacy is his political philosophy known as the Three Principles of the People: Mínzú or nationalism (independence from foreign domination), Mínquán or "rights of the people" (sometimes translated as "democracy"), and Mínshēng or people's livelihood (sometimes translated as "communitarianism" or "welfare").

Names 

Sun's genealogical name was Sun Deming (Syūn Dāk-mìhng). As a child, his pet name was Tai Tseung (Dai-jeuhng). When in school, the teacher gave him the name Sun Wen (Cantonese: Syūn Màhn), which was what Sun called himself for most of his life. Sun's courtesy name was Zaizhi (Jai-jī), and his baptized name was Rixin (Yaht-sān). While at school in Hong Kong he got the art name Yat-sen. Sun Zhongshan (Cantonese: , romanized Chung Shan), the most popular of his Chinese names in China, is derived from his Japanese name Kikori Nakayama, the pseudonym given to him by Tōten Miyazaki while in hiding in Japan. His birthplace city was renamed Zhongshan in his honour probably shortly after his death in 1925, using this name. Zhongshan is one of the few cities named after people in China. Zhongshan remained as the official name of the city during Communist rule.

Early years

Birthplace and early life 
Sun Te-ming was born on 12 November 1866 to Sun Dacheng and Madame Yang. His birthplace was the village of Cuiheng, Xiangshan County (now Zhongshan City), Canton Province (now Guangdong). He had a cultural background of Hakka and Cantonese. His father owned very little land and worked as a tailor in Macau, and as a journeyman and a porter. After finishing primary education, he moved to Honolulu in the Kingdom of Hawaii, where he lived a comfortable life of modest wealth supported by his elder brother Sun Mei.

Education years 
At the age of 10, in Hawaii, Sun began seeking schooling. He obtained secondary schooling in Hawaii. and met his childhood friend Lu Haodong. By age 13 in 1878, after receiving a few years of local schooling, Sun went to live with his elder brother, Sun Mei in Honolulu. Sun Mei financed Sun Yat-sen's education and would later be a major contributor for the overthrow of the Manchus (Qing dynasty).

During his stay in Honolulu, Sun Yat-sen went to ʻIolani School where he studied English, British history, mathematics, science, and Christianity. While he was originally unable to speak English, Sun Yat-sen quickly picked up the language and received a prize for academic achievement from King David Kalākaua before graduating in 1882. He then attended Oahu College (now known as Punahou School) for one semester. In 1883 he was sent home to China as his brother was becoming worried that Sun Yat-sen was beginning to embrace Christianity. As Hawaii was being annexed by the United States at the time, Sun obtained American citizenship.

When he returned to China in 1883 at age 17, Sun met up with his childhood friend Lu Haodong again at Beijidian, a temple in Cuiheng Village. They saw many villagers worshipping the Beiji (literally North Pole) Emperor-God in the temple, and were dissatisfied with their ancient folk healing methods. They broke the effigy
, incurring the wrath of fellow villagers, and escaped to Hong Kong. After arriving in Hong Kong in November 1883, he studied at the Diocesan Home and Orphanage on Eastern Street (now the Diocesan Boys' School), and from 15 April 1884 to his graduation in 1886, he was at The Government Central School on Gough Street (now Queen's College).

In 1886 Sun studied medicine at the Guangzhou Boji Hospital under the Christian missionary John G. Kerr. According to his book "Kidnapped in London", Sun in 1887 heard of the opening of the Hong Kong College of Medicine for Chinese (the forerunner of The University of Hong Kong) and immediately decided to benefit from the "advantages it offered." Ultimately, he earned the license of Christian practice as a medical doctor from there in 1892. Notably, of his class of 12 students, Sun was one of only two who graduated.

Religious views and Christian baptism 
In the early 1880s, Sun Mei had sent his brother to ʻIolani School, which was under the supervision of the Church of Hawai'i and directed by an Anglican prelate named Alfred Willis, with the language of instruction being English. At the school, a young Sun Wen first came in contact with Christianity. In his work, Schriffin speculated that Christianity was to have a great influence on Sun's future political career.

Sun was later baptized in Hong Kong (on 4 May 1884) by Rev. C. R. Hager an American missionary of the Congregational Church of the United States (ABCFM) to his brother's disdain. The minister would also develop a friendship with Sun. Sun attended To Tsai Church, founded by the London Missionary Society in 1888, while he studied Western Medicine in Hong Kong College of Medicine for Chinese. Sun pictured a revolution as similar to the salvation mission of the Christian church. His conversion to Christianity was related to his revolutionary ideals and push for advancement.

Transformation into a revolutionary

The Four Bandits 

During the Qing-dynasty rebellion around 1888, Sun was in Hong Kong with a group of revolutionary thinkers who were nicknamed the Four Bandits at the Hong Kong College of Medicine for Chinese. Sun, who had grown increasingly frustrated by the conservative Qing government and its refusal to adopt knowledge from the more technologically advanced Western nations, quit his medical practice in order to devote his time to transforming China.

From The Furen Literary Society to The Revive China Society 
In 1891, Sun met revolutionary friends in Hong Kong including Yeung Ku-wan who was the leader and founder of the Furen Literary Society. The group was spreading the idea of overthrowing the Qing. In 1894, Sun wrote an 8,000 character petition to Qing Viceroy Li Hongzhang presenting his ideas for modernizing China. He traveled to Tianjin to personally present the petition to Li but was not granted an audience. After this experience, Sun turned irrevocably toward revolution. He left China for Hawaii and founded the Revive China Society, which was committed to revolutionizing China's prosperity. Members were drawn mainly from Chinese expatriates, especially from the lower social classes. The same month in 1894 the Furen Literary Society was merged with the Hong Kong chapter of the Revive China Society. Thereafter, Sun became the secretary of the newly merged Revive China Society, which Yeung Ku-wan headed as president. They disguised their activities in Hong Kong under the running of a business under the name "Kuen Hang Club".

Heaven and Earth Society and overseas travels to seek financial support 
A "Heaven and Earth Society" sect known as Tiandihui had been around for a long time. The group has also been referred to as the "three cooperating organizations" as well as the triads. Sun Yat-sen mainly used this group to leverage his overseas travels to gain further financial and resource support for his revolution.

First Sino-Japanese War 
In 1895, China suffered a serious defeat during the First Sino-Japanese War. There were two types of responses. One group of intellectuals contended that the Manchu Qing government could restore its legitimacy by successfully modernizing. Stressing that overthrowing the Manchu would result in chaos and would lead to China being carved up by imperialists, intellectuals like Kang Youwei and Liang Qichao supported responding with initiatives like the Hundred Days' Reform. In another faction, Sun Yat-sen and others like Zou Rong wanted a revolution to replace the dynastic system with a modern nation-state in the form of a republic. The Hundred Days' reform turned out to be a failure by 1898.

First uprising and exile

The first Guangzhou uprising 

In the second year of the establishment of the Revive China Society, on 26 October 1895, the group planned and launched the First Guangzhou uprising against the Qing in Guangzhou. Yeung Ku-wan directed the uprising starting from Hong Kong. However, plans were leaked out and more than 70 members, including Lu Haodong, were captured by the Qing government. The uprising was a failure. Sun received financial support mostly from his brother who sold most of his 12,000 acres of ranch and cattle in Hawaii. Additionally, members of his family and relatives of Sun would take refuge at the home of his brother Sun Mei at Kamaole in Kula, Maui.

Exile in Japan 
While in exile in London (United Kingdom of Great Britain and Ireland) in 1896, Sun raised money for his revolutionary party and to support uprisings in China. While the events leading up to it are unclear, Sun Yat-sen was detained at the Chinese Legation in London, where the Chinese Imperial secret service planned to smuggle him back to China to execute him for his revolutionary actions. He was released after 12 days through the efforts of James Cantlie, The Globe, The Times, and the Foreign Office; leaving Sun a hero in the UK. James Cantlie, Sun's former teacher at the Hong Kong College of Medicine for Chinese, maintained a lifelong friendship with Sun and would later write an early biography of Sun. Sun wrote a book in 1897 about his detention, titled "Kidnapped in London".

Sun traveled by way of Canada to Japan to begin his exile there, he arrived in Yokohama on 16 August 1897 and met with the Japanese politician Tōten Miyazaki. Most Japanese who actively worked with Sun were motivated by a pan-Asian opposition to Western imperialism. While in Japan, Sun also met and befriended Mariano Ponce, then a diplomat of the First Philippine Republic.

During the Philippine Revolution and the Filipino-American War, Sun helped Ponce procure weapons salvaged from the Japanese military and ship the weapons to the Philippines. By helping the Philippine Republic, Sun hoped that the Filipinos would win their independence so that he could use the archipelago as a staging point of another revolution. However, as the war ended in July 1902, the United States emerged victorious from a bitter 3-year war against the Republic. Therefore, the Filipino dream of independence vanished with Sun's hopes of allying with the Philippines in his revolution in China.

From failed uprisings to the revolution

The Huizhou uprising 
On 22 October 1900, Sun ordered the launch of the Huizhou uprising to attack Huizhou and provincial authorities in Guangdong. This came five years after the failed Guangzhou uprising. This time, Sun appealed to the triads for help. This uprising was also a failure. Miyazaki, who participated in the revolt with Sun, wrote an account of this revolutionary effort under the title "33-year dream" in 1902.

Getting support from the Siamese Chinese 
In 1903, Sun made a secret trip to Bangkok in which he sought funds for his cause in Southeast Asia. His loyal followers published newspapers, providing invaluable support to the dissemination of his revolutionary principles and ideals among Siamese Chinese in Siam. In Bangkok, Sun visited Yaowarat Road, in Bangkok's Chinatown. It was on this street that Sun gave a speech claiming that overseas Chinese were "the Mother of the Revolution". He also met local Chinese merchants Seow Houtseng, who sent financial support to him.

Sun's speech on Yaowarat Street was commemorated by the street later being named "Sun Yat Sen Street" or "Soi Sun Yat Sen" in his honour.

Getting support from the American Chinese
According to Lee Yun-ping, chairman of the Chinese historical society, Sun needed a certificate to enter the United States at a time when the Chinese Exclusion Act of 1882 would have otherwise blocked him.

In March 1904, while residing in Kula, Maui, Sun Yat-sen obtained a Certificate of Hawaiian Birth, issued by the Territory of Hawaii, stating that "he was born in the Hawaiian Islands on the 24th day of November, A.D. 1870." He renounced it after it served its purpose to circumvent the Chinese Exclusion Act of 1882. Official files of the United States show that Sun had United States nationality, moved to China with his family at age 4, and returned to Hawaii 10 years later.

On 6 April 1904, on his first attempt to enter the United States, Sun Yat-sen landed in San Francisco. He was detained and faced with possible deportation. Sun, represented by the law firm of Ralston & Siddons based in Washington D.C., filed an appeal with the Commissioner-General of Immigration on 26 April 1904. On 28 April 1904, the acting secretary of the Department of Commerce and Labor, in a four-page decision contained in the case file, set aside the order of deportation and ordered the Commissioner of Immigration in San Francisco to "permit the said Sun Yat-sen to land."  Sun was then freed to embark on his fundraising tour in the United States.

Unifying forces in the Tongmenghui in Tokyo

In 1904, Sun Yat-sen came about with the goal "to expel the Tatar barbarians (specifically, the Manchu), to revive Zhonghua, to establish a Republic, and to distribute land equally among the people". One of Sun's major legacies was the creation of his political philosophy of the Three Principles of the People. These Principles included the principle of nationalism (minzu), of democracy (minquan), and of welfare (minsheng).

On 20 August 1905, Sun joined forces with revolutionary Chinese students studying in Tokyo to form the unified group Tongmenghui (United League), which sponsored uprisings in China. By 1906 the number of Tongmenghui members reached 963.

Getting support from the Malayan Chinese  

Sun's notability and popularity extended beyond the Greater China region, particularly to Nanyang (Southeast Asia), where a large concentration of overseas Chinese resided in Malaya (Malaysia and Singapore). While in Singapore, he met local Chinese merchants Teo Eng Hock, Tan Chor Nam and Lim Nee Soon, which mark the commencement of direct support from the Nanyang Chinese. The Singapore chapter of the Tongmenghui was established on 6 April 1906, though some records claim the founding date to be end of 1905. The villa used by Sun was known as Wan Qing Yuan. At this point Singapore was the headquarters of the Tongmenghui.

Thus, after founding the Tongmenghui, Sun advocated the establishment of The Chong Shing Yit Pao as the alliance's mouthpiece to promote revolutionary ideas. Later, he initiated the establishment of reading clubs across Singapore and Malaysia, in order to disseminate revolutionary ideas among the lower class through public readings of newspaper stories. The United Chinese Library, founded on 8 August 1910, was one such reading club, first set up at leased property on the second floor of the Wan He Salt Traders in North Boat Quay.

The first actual United Chinese Library building was built between 1908 and 1911 below Fort Canning – 51 Armenian Street, commenced operations in 1912. The library was set up as a part of the 50 reading rooms by the Chinese Republicans to serve as an information station and liaison point for the revolutionaries. In 1987, the library was moved to its present site at Cantonment Road. But the Armenian Street building is still intact with the plaque at its entrance with Sun Yat Sen's words. With an initial membership of over 400, the library has about 180 members today. Although the United Chinese Library, with 102 years of history, was not the only reading club in Singapore during the time, today it is the only one of its kind remaining.

Uprisings 
On 1 December 1907, Sun led the Zhennanguan uprising against the Qing at Friendship Pass, which is the border between Guangxi and Vietnam. The uprising failed after seven days of fighting. In 1907 there were a total of four uprisings that failed including Huanggang uprising, Huizhou seven women lake uprising and Qinzhou uprising. In 1908 two more uprisings failed one after another including Qin-lian uprising and Hekou uprising.

Anti-Sun factionalism 
Because of these failures, Sun's leadership was challenged by elements from within the Tongmenghui who wished to remove him as leader. In Tokyo, members from the recently merged Restoration society raised doubts about Sun's credentials. Tao Chengzhang and Zhang Binglin publicly denounced Sun with an open leaflet called "A declaration of Sun Yat-sen's criminal acts by the revolutionaries in Southeast Asia". This was printed and distributed in reformist newspapers like Nanyang Zonghui Bao. Their goal was to target Sun as a leader leading a revolt for profiteering gains.

The revolutionaries were polarized and split between pro-Sun and anti-Sun camps. Sun publicly fought off comments about how he had something to gain financially from the revolution. However, by 19 July 1910, the Tongmenghui headquarters had to relocate from Singapore to Penang to reduce the anti-Sun activities. It is also in Penang that Sun and his supporters would launch the first Chinese "daily" newspaper, the Kwong Wah Yit Poh in December 1910.

1911 revolution 

To sponsor more uprisings, Sun made a personal plea for financial aid at the Penang conference held on 13 November 1910 in Malaya. The high-powered Preparatory Meeting of Sun's supporters was subsequently held in Ipoh, Singapore - at the villa of Teh Lay Seng, chairman of Tungmenghui - to raise funds for the Huanghuagang Uprising, a.k.a. the Yellow Flower Mound Uprising. The Ipoh leaders were Teh Lay Seng, Wong I Ek, Lee Guan Swee and Lee Hau Cheong. The leaders launched a major drive for donations across the Malay Peninsula. They raised HK$187,000.

On 27 April 1911, revolutionary Huang Xing led a Second Guangzhou Uprising known as the Yellow Flower Mound revolt against the Qing. The revolt failed and ended in disaster; the bodies of only 72 revolutionaries were identified (86 were found). The revolutionaries are remembered as martyrs.

On 10 October 1911, a military uprising at Wuchang took place, led again by Huang Xing. The uprising expanded to the Xinhai Revolution, also known as the "Chinese Revolution" to overthrow the last Emperor Puyi.  Sun had no direct involvement in it as he was in Denver, Colorado at that time, having spent much of the year in the US in search of support from ethnic Chinese there. So it was Huang who was in charge of the revolution that ended over 2000 years of imperial rule in China. On 12 October 1911 when Sun learned of the successful rebellion against the Qing emperor from press reports, he returned to China from the United States, accompanied by his closest foreign advisor, the American "General" Homer Lea, he had met in London, where they unsuccessfully tried to arrange British financing for the future Chinese republic. Sun and Lea sailed for China, arriving there on 21 December 1911.

Republic of China with multiple governments

Provisional government 

On 29 December 1911 a meeting of representatives from provinces in Nanking (Nanjing) elected Sun Yat-sen as the "provisional president". 1 January 1912 was set as the first day of the First Year of the Republic. Li Yuanhong was made provisional vice-president and Huang Xing became the minister of the army. The new Provisional Government of the Republic of China was created along with the Provisional Constitution of the Republic of China. Sun is credited for the funding of the revolutions and for keeping the spirit of revolution alive, even after a series of failed uprisings. His successful merger of minor revolutionary groups to a single larger party provided a better base for all those who shared the same ideals. A number of things were introduced such as the republic calendar system and new fashion like Zhongshan suits.

Beiyang government 

Yuan Shikai, who controlled the Beiyang Army, the military of northern China, was promised the position of president of the Republic of China if he could get the Qing court to abdicate. On 12 February 1912 Emperor Puyi did abdicate the throne. Sun stepped down as president, and Yuan became the new provisional president in Beijing on 10 March 1912. The provisional government did not have any military forces of its own. Its control over elements of the New Army that had mutinied was limited and there were still significant forces which still had not declared against the Qing.

Sun Yat-sen sent telegrams to the leaders of all provinces requesting them to elect and to establish the National Assembly of the Republic of China in 1912. In May 1912 the legislative assembly moved from Nanjing to Beijing with its 120 members divided between members of Tongmenghui and a Republican party that supported Yuan Shikai. Many revolutionary members were already alarmed by Yuan's ambitions and the northern based Beiyang government.

New Nationalist party in 1912, failed Second Revolution and new exile 
Tongmenghui member Song Jiaoren quickly tried to control the parliament. He mobilized the old Tongmenghui at the core with the mergers of a number of new small parties to form a new political party called the Kuomintang (Chinese nationalist party, commonly abbreviated as "KMT") on 25 August 1912 at Huguang Guild Hall Beijing. The 1912–1913 National assembly election was considered a huge success for the KMT winning 269 of the 596 seats in the lower house and 123 of the 274 senate seats. In retaliation the national party leader Song Jiaoren was assassinated, almost certainly by a secret order of Yuan, on 20 March 1913. The Second Revolution took place where Sun and KMT military forces tried to overthrow Yuan's forces of about 80,000 men in an armed conflict in July 1913. The revolt against Yuan was unsuccessful. In August 1913, Sun Yat-sen fled to Japan, where he later enlisted financial aid via politician and industrialist Fusanosuke Kuhara.

Warlords chaos 
In 1915 Yuan Shikai proclaimed the Empire of China with himself as Emperor of China. Sun took part in the Anti-Monarchy war of the Constitutional Protection Movement, while also supporting bandit leaders like Bai Lang during the Bai Lang Rebellion. This marked the beginning of the Warlord Era. In 1915 Sun wrote to the Second International, a socialist-based organization in Paris, asking it to send a team of specialists to help China set up the world's first socialist republic and in the same year received Indian communist M.N. Roy as a guest. At the time there were many theories and proposals of what China could be. In the political mess, both Sun Yat-sen and Xu Shichang were announced as president of the Republic of China.

Alliance with the Communist Party and the Northern Expedition

Guangzhou militarist government 

China had become divided among regional military leaders. Sun saw the danger of this and returned to China in 1916 to advocate Chinese reunification. In 1921 he started a self-proclaimed military government in Guangzhou and was elected Grand Marshal. Between 1912 and 1927 three governments were set up in South China: the Provisional government in Nanjing (1912), the Military government in Guangzhou (1921–1925), and the National government in Guangzhou and later Wuhan (1925–1927). These governments in the South were established to rival the Beiyang government in the North. Yuan Shikai had banned the KMT. The short lived Chinese Revolutionary Party was a temporary replacement for the KMT. On 10 October 1919 Sun resurrected the KMT with the new name Chung-kuo Kuomintang, or "Nationalist Party of China".

KMT–CCP cooperation 

By this time Sun had become convinced that the only hope for a unified China lay in a military conquest from his base in the south, followed by a period of political tutelage that would culminate in the transition to democracy. In order to hasten the conquest of China, he began a policy of active cooperation with the Chinese Communist Party (CCP). Sun and the Soviet Union's Adolph Joffe signed the Sun-Joffe Manifesto in January 1923. Sun received help from the Comintern for his acceptance of communist members into his KMT. Revolutionary and socialist leader Vladimir Lenin praised Sun and the KMT for their ideology and principles. Lenin praised Sun and his attempts at social reformation, and also congratulated him for fighting foreign imperialism. Sun also returned the praise, calling Lenin a "great man", and indicated he wished to follow the same path that Lenin had. In 1923, after having been in contact with Lenin and other Moscow communists, Sun sent representatives to study the Red Army and in turn the Soviets sent representatives to help reorganize the KMT at Sun's request.

With the Soviets' help, Sun was able to develop the military power needed for the Northern Expedition against the military at the north. He established the Whampoa Military Academy near Guangzhou with Chiang Kai-shek as the commandant of the National Revolutionary Army (NRA). Other Whampoa leaders include Wang Jingwei and Hu Hanmin as political instructors. This full collaboration was called the First United Front.

Finance concerns 
In 1924 Sun appointed his brother-in-law T. V. Soong to set up the first Chinese Central bank called the Canton Central Bank. To establish national capitalism and a banking system was a major objective for the KMT. However Sun was not without some opposition as there was the Canton volunteers corps uprising against him.

Final speeches 

In February 1923 Sun made a presentation to the Students' Union in Hong Kong University and declared that it was the corruption of China and the peace, order and good government of Hong Kong that turned him into a revolutionary. This same year, he delivered a speech in which he proclaimed his Three Principles of the People as the foundation of the country and the Five-Yuan Constitution as the guideline for the political system and bureaucracy. Part of the speech was made into the National Anthem of the Republic of China.

On 10 November 1924, Sun traveled north to Tianjin and delivered a speech to suggest a gathering for a "national conference" for the Chinese people. It called for the end of warlord rules and the abolition of all unequal treaties with the Western powers. Two days later, he traveled to Beijing to discuss the future of the country, despite his deteriorating health and the ongoing civil war of the warlords. Among the people he met was the Muslim warlord General Ma Fuxiang, who informed Sun that he would welcome his leadership. On 28 November 1924 Sun traveled to Japan and gave a speech on Pan-Asianism at Kobe, Japan.

Illness and death 
For many years, it was popularly believed that Sun died of liver cancer. On 26 January 1925, Sun underwent an exploratory laparotomy at Peking Union Medical College Hospital (PUMCH) to investigate a long-term illness. This was performed by the head of the Department of Surgery, Adrian S. Taylor, who stated that the procedure "revealed extensive involvement of the liver by carcinoma" and that Sun only had about ten days to live. Sun was hospitalized and his condition was treated with radium. Sun survived the initial ten-day period and on 18 February, against the advice of doctors, he was transferred to the KMT headquarters and treated with traditional Chinese medicine. This too was unsuccessful and he died on 12 March at the age of 58. Contemporary reports in The New York Times, Time, and the Chinese newspaper Qun Qiang Bao all reported the cause of death as liver cancer, based on Taylor's observation.

Following this the body then was preserved in mineral oil and taken to the Temple of Azure Clouds, a Buddhist shrine in the Western Hills a few miles outside of Beijing. He also left a short political will penned by Wang Jingwei, which had a widespread influence in the subsequent development of the Republic of China and Taiwan.

In 1926, construction began on a majestic mausoleum at the foot of Purple Mountain in Nanjing, and this was completed in the spring of 1929. On 1 June 1929, Sun's remains were moved from Beijing and interred in the Sun Yat-sen Mausoleum.

By pure chance, in May 2016, an American pathologist named Rolf F. Barth was visiting the Sun Yat-sen Memorial Hall in Guangzhou when he noticed a faded copy of the original autopsy report on display. The autopsy was performed immediately after Sun's death by James Cash, a pathologist at PUMCH. Based on a tissue sample, Cash concluded that the cause of death was an adenocarcinoma in the gallbladder that had metastasized to the liver. In modern China, liver cancer is far more common than gallbladder cancer and although the incidence rates of either in 1925 are not known, if one assumes that they were similar at that time, then the original diagnosis by Taylor was a logical conclusion. From the time of Sun's death until the appearance of Barth's report in the Chinese Journal of Cancer in September 2016, the true cause of death of Sun Yat-sen was not reported in any English-language publication. Even in Chinese-language sources, it only appeared in one non-medical online report in 2013.

Legacy

Power struggle 

After Sun's death, a power struggle between his young protégé Chiang Kai-shek and his old revolutionary comrade Wang Jingwei split the KMT. At stake in this struggle was the right to lay claim to Sun's ambiguous legacy. In 1927 Chiang Kai-shek married Soong Mei-ling, a sister of Sun's widow Soong Ching-ling, and subsequently he could claim to be a brother-in-law of Sun. When the Communists and the Kuomintang split in 1927, marking the start of the Chinese Civil War, each group claimed to be his true heirs, a conflict that continued through World War II. Sun's widow, Soong Ching-ling, sided with the Communists during the Chinese Civil War and served from 1949 to 1981 as vice-president (or vice-chairwoman) of the People's Republic of China and as honorary president shortly before her death in 1981.

Cult of personality 
A personality cult in the Republic of China was centered on Sun and his successor, Generalissimo Chiang Kai-shek. Chinese Muslim Generals and Imams participated in this cult of personality and one party state, with Muslim General Ma Bufang making people bow to Sun's portrait and listen to the national anthem during a Tibetan and Mongol religious ceremony for the Qinghai Lake God. Quotes from the Quran and Hadith were used among Hui Muslims to justify Chiang Kai-shek's rule over China.

The Kuomintang's constitution designated Sun as party president. After his death, the Kuomintang opted to keep that language in its constitution to honor his memory forever. The party has since been headed by a director-general (1927–1975) and a chairman (since 1975), which discharge the functions of the president.

Father of the Nation 

Sun Yat-sen remains unique among 20th-century Chinese leaders for having a high reputation both in mainland China and in Taiwan. In Taiwan, he is seen as the Father of the Republic of China, and is known by the posthumous name Father of the Nation, Mr. Sun Zhongshan (where the one-character space is a traditional homage symbol). His likeness is still almost always found in ceremonial locations such as in front of legislatures and classrooms of public schools, from elementary to senior high school, and he continues to appear in new coinage and currency.

Forerunner of the revolution 

On the mainland, Sun is seen as a Chinese nationalist, proto-socialist, first president of a Republican China and is highly regarded as the Forerunner of the Revolution. He is even mentioned by name in the preamble to the Constitution of the People's Republic of China. In recent years, the leadership of the Chinese Communist Party has increasingly invoked Sun, partly as a way of bolstering Chinese nationalism in light of Chinese economic reform and partly to increase connections with supporters of the Kuomintang on Taiwan which the PRC sees as allies against Taiwan independence. Sun's tomb was one of the first stops made by the leaders of both the Kuomintang and the People First Party on their pan-blue visit to mainland China in 2005. A massive portrait of Sun continues to appear in Tiananmen Square for May Day and National Day.

In 1956, Mao Zedong said, "Let us pay tribute to our great revolutionary forerunner, Dr. Sun Yat-sen!...he bequeathed to us much that is useful in the sphere of political thought."

Economic development
Sun Yat-sen spent years in Hawaii as a student in the late 1870s and early 1880s, and was highly impressed with the economic development he saw there. He used the independent Kingdom of Hawaii as a model to develop his vision of a technologically modern and politically independent and actively anti-imperialist China. Sun Yat-sen was an important pioneer of international development, proposing in the 1920s international institutions of the sort that appeared after World War II. He focused on China, with its vast potential and weak base of mostly local entrepreneurs. 
His key proposal was socialism. He proposed:
The State will take over all the large enterprises; we shall encourage and protect enterprises which may reasonably be entrusted to the people; the nation will possess equality with other nations; every Chinese will be equal to every other Chinese both politically and in his opportunities of economic advancement.

He also proposed "If we use existing foreign capital to build up a future communist society in China, half the work will bring double the results." and "It is my idea to make capitalism create socialism in China".

Sun promoted the ideas of economist Henry George and was influenced by his ideas on land ownership.

Controversy

New Three Principles of the People 

Sun's Three Principles of the People has been reinterpreted by the Chinese Communist Party to argue that communism is a necessary conclusion of the Three Principles of the People and thus provides legitimacy for the communist government. This reinterpretation of the Three Principles of the People is commonly referred to as the New Three Principles of the People (also translated as Neo-tridemism), a word coined by Mao's 1940 essay On New Democracy, in which he argued that the Communist Party is a better enforcer of the Three Principles of the People compared to the bourgeois Nationalist Party and that the new three principles are about allying with the communists and the Russians (Soviets), and supporting peasants and the workers. Proponents of the New Three Principles of the People claim that Sun's book Three Principles of the People acknowledges that the principles of welfare is inherently socialistic and communistic.

During the 90th anniversary of the Xinhai Revolution in 2001, former CCP General Secretary Jiang Zemin claimed that Sun Yat-sen supposedly advocated for the "New Three Principles of the People". In 2001, Sun's granddaughter Lily Sun said that the CCP was distorting Sun's legacy. She then voiced her displeasure in 2002 in a private letter to Jiang about the distortion of history. In 2008 Jiang Zemin was willing to offer US$10 million to sponsor a Xinhai Revolution anniversary celebration event. According to Ming Pao she did not take the money because then she "won't have the freedom to properly communicate the Revolution".

KMT emblem removal case 
In 1981, Lily Sun took a trip to Sun Yat-sen mausoleum in Nanjing, People's Republic of China. The emblem of the KMT had been removed from the top of his sacrificial hall at the time of her visit, but was later restored. On another visit in May 2011, she was surprised to find the four characters "General Rules of Meetings", a document that Sun wrote in reference to Robert's Rules of Order had been removed from a stone carving.

Founding father of the nation debate

In 1940, the Republic of China (ROC) government had bestowed the title of "father of the nation" on Sun. However, after 1949, as a result of the Chiang regime's arrival in Taiwan, his "father of the nation" designation only continued on in Taiwan.

Sun had visited Taiwan briefly on only three occasions - in 1900, 1913 and 1918 - or four, if counting 1924 when his boat had stopped in Keelung Harbor, but he had not disembarked.

In November 2004, the ROC Ministry of Education proposed that Sun Yat-sen was not the father of Taiwan. Instead, Sun was a foreigner from mainland China. Taiwanese Education minister Tu Cheng-sheng and Examination Yuan member , both of whom supported the proposal, had their portraits pelted with eggs in protest. At a Sun Yat-sen statue in Kaohsiung, a 70-year-old ROC retired soldier committed suicide as a way to protest the ministry proposal on the anniversary of Sun's birthday 12 November.

Family 

Sun Yat-sen was born to Sun Dacheng and his wife, Lady Yang on 12 November 1866. At the time his father was age 53, while his mother was 38 years old. He had an older brother, Sun Dezhang, and an older sister, Sun Jinxing, who died at the early age of 4. Another older brother, Sun Deyou, died at the age of 6. He also had an older sister, Sun Miaoqian, and a younger sister, Sun Qiuqi.

At age 20, Sun had an arranged marriage with fellow villager Lu Muzhen. She bore a son, Sun Fo, and two daughters, Sun Jinyuan and Sun Jinwan. Sun Fo was the grandfather of Leland Sun, who spent 37 years working in Hollywood as an actor and stuntman. Sun Yat-sen was also the godfather of Paul Myron Anthony Linebarger, American author and poet who wrote under the name Cordwainer Smith.

Sun's first concubine, the Hong Kong-born Chen Cuifen, lived in Taiping, Perak (now in Malaysia) for 17 years. The couple adopted a local girl as their daughter. Cuifen subsequently relocated to China, where she died.

During Sun's exile in Japan, he had relationships with two Japanese women: 15-year-old Haru Asada, whom he took as a concubine up to her death in 1902; and another 15-year-old school-girl Kaoru Otsuki, whom Sun married in 1905 and abandoned the next year while she was pregnant. Otsuki later had their daughter Fumiko adopted by the Miyagawa family in Yokohama, who did not discover her parentage until 1951, 26 years after Sun's death.

On 25 October 1915 in Japan, Sun married Soong Ching-ling, one of the Soong sisters. Soong Ching-ling's father was the American-educated Methodist minister Charles Soong, who made a fortune in banking and in printing of Bibles. Although Charles had been a personal friend of Sun, he was enraged when Sun announced his intention to marry Ching-ling because while Sun was a Christian he kept two wives, Lu Muzhen and Kaoru Otsuki. Soong viewed Sun's actions as running directly against their shared religion.

Soong Ching-Ling's sister, Soong Mei-ling, later married Chiang Kai-shek.

Cultural references

Memorials and structures in Asia 

In most major Chinese cities one of the main streets is named Zhongshan Lu to celebrate his memory. There are also numerous parks, schools, and geographical features named after him. Xiangshan, Sun's hometown in Guangdong, was renamed Zhongshan in his honor, and there is a hall dedicated to his memory at the Temple of Azure Clouds in Beijing. There are also a series of Sun Yat-sen stamps.

Other references to Sun include the Sun Yat-sen University in Guangzhou and National Sun Yat-sen University in Kaohsiung. Other structures include Sun Yat-sen Mausoleum, Sun Yat-sen Memorial Hall subway station, Sun Yat-sen house in Nanjing, Dr Sun Yat-sen Museum in Hong Kong, Chung-Shan Building, Sun Yat-sen Memorial Hall in Guangzhou, Sun Yat-sen Memorial Hall in Taipei and Sun Yat Sen Nanyang Memorial Hall in Singapore. Zhongshan Memorial Middle School has also been a name used by many schools. Zhongshan Park is also a common name used for a number of places named after him. The first highway in Taiwan is called the Sun Yat-sen expressway. Two ships are also named after him, the Chinese gunboat Chung Shan and Chinese cruiser Yat Sen. The old Chinatown in Calcutta (now known as Kolkata), India has a prominent street by the name of Sun Yat-sen street.

In Russia, a village in Mikhaylovsky District of Primorsky Krai was named Sunyatsenskoe in honor of him. There are streets named after him in Astrakhan, Ufa and Aldan. There was a street that was named after Sun in the Russian city of Omsk until 2005 when it was renamed in honor of the recipient of the title Hero of Soviet Union Mikhail Ivanovich Leonov.

In George Town, Penang, Malaysia, the Penang Philomatic Union had its premises at 120 Armenian Street in 1910, during the time when Sun spent more than four months in Penang, convened the historic "Penang Conference" to launch the fundraising campaign for the Huanghuagang Uprising and founded the Kwong Wah Yit Poh; this house, which has been preserved as the Sun Yat-sen Museum (formerly called the Sun Yat Sen Penang Base), was visited by president-designate Hu Jintao in 2002. The Penang Philomatic Union subsequently moved to a bungalow at 65 Macalister Road which has been preserved as the Sun Yat-sen Memorial Centre Penang.

As dedication, the 1966 Chinese Cultural Renaissance was launched on Sun's birthday on 12 November.

The Nanyang Wan Qing Yuan in Singapore have since been preserved and renamed as the Sun Yat Sen Nanyang Memorial Hall. A Sun Yat-sen heritage trail was also launched on 20 November 2010 in Penang.

Sun's US citizen Hawaii birth certificate that show he was not born in the ROC, but instead born in the US was on public display at the American Institute in Taiwan on US Independence day 4 July 2011.

A street in Medan, Indonesia is named "Jalan Sun Yat-Sen" in honour of him.

A street named "Tôn Dật Tiên" (Sino-Vietnamese name for Sun Yat-Sen) is located in Ho Chi Minh City, Vietnam.
A street named Sun Yat Sen in Kolkata (Calcutta) at Tiretti Bazar

The "Trail of Dr. Sun Yat Sen and His Comrades in Ipoh" was established in 2019, based on the book "Road to Revolution: Dr. Sun Yat Sen and His Comrades in Ipoh".

Gallery

Memorials and structures outside of Asia 

St. John's University in New York City has a facility built in 1973, the Sun Yat-Sen Memorial Hall, built to resemble a traditional Chinese building in honor of Sun. Dr. Sun Yat-Sen Classical Chinese Garden is located in Vancouver, the largest classical Chinese gardens outside of Asia. There is the Dr. Sun Yat-sen Memorial Park in Chinatown, Honolulu. On the island of Maui, there is the little Sun Yat-sen Park at Kamaole. It is located near to where his older brother had a ranch on the slopes of Haleakala in the Kula region.

In Chinatown, Los Angeles, there is a seated statue of him in Central Plaza. In Sacramento, California there is a bronze statue of Sun in front of the Chinese Benevolent Association of Sacramento. Another statue of Sun Yat-sen by Joe Rosenthal can be found at Riverdale Park in Toronto, Ontario, Canada, and there is another statue in Toronto's downtown Chinatown. There is also the Moscow Sun Yat-sen University. In Chinatown, San Francisco, there is a 12-foot statue of him on Saint Mary's Square.

In late 2011, the Chinese Youth Society of Melbourne, in celebration of the 100th anniversary of the founding of the Republic of China, unveiled, in a Lion Dance Blessing ceremony, a memorial statue of Sun outside the Chinese Museum in Melbourne's Chinatown, on the spot where their traditional Chinese New Year Lion Dance always ends.

In 1993 Lily Sun, one of Sun Yat-sen's granddaughters, donated books, photographs, artwork and other memorabilia to the Kapi'olani Community College library as part of the "Sun Yat-sen Asian collection". During October and November every year the entire collection is shown. In 1997 the "Dr Sun Yat-sen Hawaii foundation" was formed online as a virtual library. In 2006 the NASA Mars Exploration Rover Spirit labeled one of the hills explored "Zhongshan".

The plaque shown earlier in this article is by Dora Gordine, and is situated on the site of Sun's lodgings in London in 1896, 8 Grays Inn Place. There is also a blue plaque commemorating Sun at The Kennels, Cottered, Hertfordshire, the country home of the Cantlies where Sun came to recuperate after his rescue from the legation in 1896.

A street named Sun Yat-Sen Avenue is located in Markham, Ontario. This is the first such street name outside of Asia.

In popular culture

Opera 
Dr. Sun Yat-sen is a 2011 Chinese-language western-style opera in three acts by the New York-based American composer Huang Ruo who was born in China and is a graduate of Oberlin College's Conservatory as well as the Juilliard School. The libretto was written by Candace Mui-ngam Chong, a recent collaborator with playwright David Henry Hwang. It was performed in Hong Kong in October 2011 and was given its North American premiere on 26 July 2014 at The Santa Fe Opera.

TV series and films 
The life of Sun is portrayed in various films, mainly The Soong Sisters and Road to Dawn. A fictionalized assassination attempt on his life was featured in Bodyguards and Assassins. He is also portrayed during his struggle to overthrow the Qing dynasty in Once Upon a Time in China II. The TV series Towards the Republic features Ma Shaohua as Sun Yat-sen. In the 100th anniversary tribute of the film 1911, Winston Chao played Sun. In Space: Above and Beyond, one of the starships of the China Navy is named the Sun Yat-sen.

Performances 
In 2010, a theatrical play Yellow Flower on Slopes was created and performed.
In 2011, there is also a Mandopop group called "Zhongsan Road 100" known for singing the song "Our Father of the Nation".

Works 
 Kidnapped in London (1897)
 The Outline of National Reconstruction/Chien Kuo Ta Kang (1918)
 The Fundamentals of National Reconstruction/Jianguo fanglue (1924)
 The Principle of Nationalism (1953)

See also 

Chiang Kai-shek
History of the Republic of China
Politics of the Republic of China
Sun Yat-sen Museum Penang
United States Constitution and worldwide influence
Zhongshan suit
Kuomintang
Three Principles of the People

Notes

References

Further reading 
 online free to borrow
Buck, Pearl S., The Man Who Changed China: The Story of Sun Yat-sen (1953) online, popular biography by famous writer
 Chen, Stephen, and Robert Payne. Sun Yat Sen A Portrait (1946) online
 Cheng, Chu-yuan ed. Sun Yat-sen's Doctrine In The Modern World (1989)
 D'Elia, Paschal M. Sun Yat-sen. His Life and Its Meaning, a Critical Biography (1936)
 Du, Yue. "Sun Yat-sen as Guofu: Competition over Nationalist Party Orthodoxy in the Second Sino-Japanese War." Modern China 45.2 (2019): 201–235.
 Jansen, Marius B. The Japanese and Sun Yat-sen (1967) online
 Kayloe, Tjio. The Unfinished Revolution: Sun Yat-Sen and the Struggle for Modern China (2017). excerpt
 Khoo, Salma Nasution. Sun Yat Sen in Penang (Areca Books, 2008).
 
 Linebarger, Paul M.A. Political Doctrines Of Sun Yat-sen (1937) online free
Martin, Bernard. Sun Yat-sen's vision for China (1966)
Restarick, Henry B., Sun Yat-sen, Liberator of China. (Yale UP, 1931)
Schiffrin, Harold Z. "The Enigma of Sun Yat-sen" in Mary Wright, ed., China in Revolution: The First Phase 1900-1913 (1968) pp 443–476.
Schiffrin, Harold Z. Sun Yat-sen: Reluctant Revolutionary (1980)
Schiffrin, Harold Z. Sun Yat-sen and the origins of the Chinese revolution (1968).
 Shen, Stephen and Robert Payne. Sun Yat-Sen: A Portrait (1946) online free
 Soong, Irma Tam. "Sun Yat-sen's Christian Schooling in Hawai'i." The Hawaiian Journal of History, vol. 31 (1997) online 
 Wilbur, Clarence Martin. Sun Yat-sen, frustrated patriot (Columbia University Press, 1976), a major scholarly biography online
 Yu, George T. "The 1911 Revolution: Past, Present, and Future," Asian Survey, 31#10 (1991), pp. 895–904, online historiography

External links 

ROC Government Biography 
 Sun Yat-sen in Hong Kong University of Hong Kong Libraries, Digital Initiatives
Contemporary views of Sun among overseas Chinese
 Yokohama Overseas Chinese School established by Sun Yat-sen
 National Dr. Sun Yat-sen Memorial Hall Official Website 
Homer Lea Research Center
 Dr. Sun Yat-Sen Foundation of Hawaii A virtual library on Sun in Hawaii including sources for six visits
 Who is Homer Lea? Sun's best friend. He trained Chinese soldiers and prepared the frame work for the 1911 Chinese Revolution.
 
 
Funeral procession for Sun Yat-sen in Chinatown, Los Angeles at the Los Angeles Times Photographic Archive (Collection 1429). UCLA Library Special Collections, Charles E. Young Research Library, University of California, Los Angeles.

 
 
1866 births
1925 deaths
20th-century Chinese heads of government
Alumni of the University of Hong Kong
Asian Christian socialists
Chinese Christians
Burials in Nanjing
Cao Dai saints
Chinese Congregationalists
Chinese expatriates in Hong Kong
Chinese expatriates in Japan
Chinese expatriates in the Hawaiian Kingdom
Chinese Nationalist heads of state
Chinese political philosophers
Chinese revolutionaries
Chinese socialists
Chinese Zionists
Congregationalist socialists
Progressivism in China
Converts to Christianity
Deaths from cancer in China
Deaths from liver cancer
Asian democratic socialists
Flag designers
Generalissimos
ʻIolani School alumni
Marshals of China
National anthem writers
Pan-Asianists
People educated at Diocesan Boys' School
People from Maui
People from Oahu
People of the 1911 Revolution
Philosophers from Guangdong
Physicians from Guangdong
Political party founders
Politicians from Zhongshan
Presidents of the Republic of China
Alumni of Queen's College, Hong Kong
Republic of China politicians from Guangdong
Sun Yat-sen family
Tongmenghui members